Polycera hummi is a species of sea slug, a nudibranch, a shell-less marine gastropod mollusc in the family Polyceridae.

Distribution 
This species was described from the Gulf of Mexico, Florida. It also occurs in North Carolina.

References

Polyceridae
Gastropods described in 1952